Éver Maximiliano David Banega (born 29 June 1988) is an Argentine professional footballer who plays for Saudi Arabian club Al Shabab as a central midfielder.

He started his career with Boca Juniors, and signed with Valencia in 2008 where he remained for several years, appearing in 162 official games and winning the 2008 Copa del Rey. After joining Sevilla in 2014, he conquered three Europa League trophies over two separate spells.

Banega represented Argentina at the 2018 World Cup. Additionally, he won an Olympic medal in 2008 and appeared in three Copa América tournaments, helping the team to the final of the 2015 and 2016 editions.

Club career

Boca Juniors
Born in Rosario, Santa Fe, Banega came through the youth ranks at Boca Juniors, reaching the first team at 18, and winning immediate recognition thanks to his passing average and his performances in the Primera División. After teammate midfielder Fernando Gago moved to Real Madrid in January 2007, he was named as his successor despite his young age.

Banega made his professional debut in the 4–0 win against Banfield on 10 February 2007. On 1 April, just a few matches afterwards, he was given an ovation when he left the field.

Valencia

On 5 January 2008, Banega signed with Spanish side Valencia on a -year deal, for a fee of around €20 million. He made his debut on the 13th in a 0–1 loss at Atlético Madrid, coming on as a half-time substitute.

Banega was loaned to Atlético Madrid for 2008–09. He made his official debut as a substitute during the Colchoneross 3–0 away victory over PSV Eindhoven, in the first group stage match of the season's UEFA Champions League. However, he failed to settle in the team's starting XI, also being sent off in away draws against Villarreal and Almería.

Following his return from Atlético, it appeared that Banega was to join English club Everton, but a move did not materialise due to problems acquiring a visa. He subsequently returned for the 2009–10 campaign, and assisted both goals in Valencia's opening game against Sevilla. He scored his first goal for the Che on 17 January 2010 in a 4–1 defeat of neighbouring Villarreal.

Banega played 28 matches in 2010–11 (19 starts, two goals), as Valencia finished third and qualified to the Champions League. On 19 February 2012, however, he prolonged an existing spell on the sidelines – he had recently returned from a knee injury – after he was run over by his own car. As a result, he fractured his left ankle and broke the tibia and fibula in his left leg, according to Valencia team doctor Enrique Gastaldi. He required ankle surgery, going on to miss the remainder of the season; the club only confirmed that the player had been hurt in an accident involving his own car after leaving training, however Spanish media had reported that the injury occurred when he failed to put the handbrake on at a petrol station and, after the car moved, his leg was caught between the wheel and the curb.

On 31 January 2014, Banega was loaned to Newell's Old Boys in his country, until the end of the campaign.

Sevilla

On 19 August 2014, Banega joined Sevilla for an undisclosed fee, crediting his decision to move clubs to manager Unai Emery, who had managed him at Valencia. He made his official debut four days later, replacing Aleix Vidal for the final 20 minutes of a 1–1 draw against his former team.

On 27 May 2015, Banega started for Sevilla in the 2015 UEFA Europa League Final defeat of Dnipro at Poland's National Stadium, being named player of the match in the process. On 11 August, in the ensuing edition of the UEFA Super Cup, he scored the fastest ever goal in the competition through a third-minute free kick, but in a 5–4 loss to Barcelona.

Even though he had been deemed surplus to requirements the year before by the same manager, Banega continued to be an undisputed starter in 2015–16, netting nine times in 46 competitive appearances. He played the full 90 minutes in the Europa League final, won 3–1 against Liverpool. In his last game for the Andalusians, the final of the Copa del Rey on 22 May 2016, he was sent off for a 90th-minute tackle on Neymar in an eventual 2–0 defeat to Barcelona after extra time.

Inter Milan
On 16 May 2016, it was announced that Banega would sign for Inter Milan as a free agent, with the move being made effective on 1 July. In his first interview, he stated: "I'm very excited to play for a club like Inter", adding "I cannot wait to play for Inter." He was officially presented on 12 August, being given squad number 19.

Banega made his Serie A debut on 21 August 2016, starting and playing 70 minutes in a 2–0 away loss against ChievoVerona. On 11 September, at newly promoted Pescara, he provided the first goal of Mauro Icardi in an eventual 2–1 comeback win for the first three points of the season.

Banega was named in Inter's Europa League squad, starting in their first match against Hapoel Be'er Sheva, which finished in a 0–2 defeat at the San Siro. He scored his first goal for the nerazzurri on 2 October, but in a 2–1 away loss to Roma.

During the first part of the campaign, Banega started mostly but was also benched on occasion, which led to rumours of a possible move in the winter transfer window. On 5 March 2017 he returned to the starting XI for the league match against Cagliari, assisting Ivan Perišić and scoring himself a free kick in a 5–1 away victory. One week later, he netted his first hat-trick as a professional in the 7–1 home thrashing of Atalanta, which set a new league personal best at six goals.

Return to Sevilla
On 27 June 2017, a mere 13 months after leaving the Ramón Sánchez Pizjuán Stadium, Banega returned to Sevilla. He was sent off in his first league game in his second spell for allegedly insulting the referee, immediately after being booked for committing a foul in the last minutes of the 1–1 home draw against Espanyol.

Al Shabab
In January 2020, it was announced that Banega would join Al Shabab of the Saudi Professional League when the Europa League, in which Sevilla were winners, ended.

International career

Banega was selected for the Argentine under-20 team, alongside Sergio Agüero, for the 2007 FIFA World Cup in Canada, appearing in all seven games for the eventual champions. Soon after joining Valencia in January 2008 he made his debut for the full side, in a 5–0 friendly win over Guatemala on 6 February which he started. During that summer, he appeared for the nation at the Summer Olympics, helping to conquer the gold medal.

In spite of a solid season with Valencia, Banega was not selected for the 2010 FIFA World Cup in South Africa by manager Diego Maradona. He was however a member of the 2011 Copa América squad, playing the first two group matches as the hosts reached the quarter-finals under Sergio Batista. On 26 March 2013 he scored his first goal, finishing a Clemente Rodríguez cross to equalise in a 1–1 draw away to Bolivia in the 2014 World Cup qualifiers, but was not chosen for the squad that appeared in the finals.

Banega was selected by coach Gerardo Martino for the 2015 Copa América, starting in the team's opening fixture against Paraguay in La Serena. He was one of two players to miss his penalty shootout attempt in the final, a 4–1 loss to Chile, with Claudio Bravo saving it.

Banega started all the games in the Copa América Centenario in the United States, lost 4–2 in the same fashion to the same opponent. Previously, in the opening match of the group stage, he had scored in a 2–1 win over the same team, also setting up Ángel Di María's first goal.

Banega was included in the final squad for the 2018 World Cup. He made his debut in the competition on 16 June, playing 36 minutes in the 1–1 group stage draw against Iceland after replacing Lucas Biglia. In the final group match against Nigeria at the Krestovsky Stadium, he assisted Lionel Messi's opening goal with a long ball over the defence; the match eventually ended in a 2–1 victory, which saw his team progress to the second round as group runners-up behind Croatia, and he also featured the entire 3–4 round-of-16 defeat to France.

Style of play
A tactically intelligent and versatile playmaker, Banega is mostly known for his technical skills, dribbling ability, quick feet, vision and accurate passing, which enables him to retain possession, dictate the tempo of his team's play in midfield and create goalscoring opportunities for his teammates. Although he is usually deployed as a central midfielder, he can also be deployed as an attacking one; whilst at Boca Juniors, he operated as a defensive midfielder, or as a deep-lying playmaker due to his creativity, work-rate, and ball-winning abilities, and he is also an accurate set-piece taker.

Banega's former Internazionale coach Roberto Mancini said of him: "Banega is a midfielder who likes to mix it up a lot. He can start by playing off the front man and drop deep to pick up the ball. He plays for Argentina, he's got quality and charisma and I'm sure he'll be very useful to us."

Career statistics
Club

International

Scores and results list Argentina's goal tally first, score column indicates score after each Banega goal.

HonoursBoca JuniorsCopa Libertadores: 2007ValenciaCopa del Rey: 2007–08SevillaUEFA Europa League: 2014–15, 2015–16, 2019–20
Copa del Rey runner-up: 2017–18Argentina U20FIFA U-20 World Cup: 2007Argentina U23Summer Olympic Games: 2008ArgentinaCopa América runner-up: 2015, 2016Individual'
UEFA Europa League Squad of the Season: 2014–15, 2015–16, 2019–20
Saudi Professional League Player of the Month: October 2020, February 2021

Notes

References

External links

CiberChe stats and bio 

1988 births
Living people
Argentine footballers
Footballers from Rosario, Santa Fe
Association football midfielders
Argentine Primera División players
Boca Juniors footballers
Newell's Old Boys footballers
La Liga players
Atlético Madrid footballers
Valencia CF players
Sevilla FC players
Serie A players
Inter Milan players
Saudi Professional League players
Al-Shabab FC (Riyadh) players
UEFA Europa League winning players
Argentina under-20 international footballers
Argentina international footballers
2011 Copa América players
2015 Copa América players
2018 FIFA World Cup players
Copa América Centenario players
Footballers at the 2008 Summer Olympics
Olympic footballers of Argentina
Olympic medalists in football
Medalists at the 2008 Summer Olympics
Olympic gold medalists for Argentina
Argentine expatriate footballers
Expatriate footballers in Spain
Expatriate footballers in Italy
Expatriate footballers in Saudi Arabia
Argentine expatriate sportspeople in Spain
Argentine expatriate sportspeople in Italy
Argentine expatriate sportspeople in Saudi Arabia